Bhuri Bai is an Indian Bhil artist. She was born in Pitol village, situated on the border of Madhya Pradesh and Gujarat. Pitol is a village of Jhabua district in Madhya Pradesh. Bhuri Bai belongs to the community of Bhils, the largest tribal group of India. She has won many awards including the highest state honour accorded to artists by the Madhya Pradesh government, the Shikhar Samman. She was awarded India's fourth highest civilian award the Padma Shri in 2021.

Early life 
Like her contemporary Jangarh Singh Shyam, Bhuri Bai was encouraged by J Swaminathan of Bhopal's Bharat Bhavan to start using acrylic colours and paper to make paintings. Before that, she, like other members of her community, would create art on the walls of her home. Bhuri was proficient in the making of Pithora paintings.“In the village, we had to work so hard to extract colour from plants and clay. And here I was given so many shades of colour and a ready made brush!”Besides painting, Bhuri Bai is also adept at the skill of hut-making, which she learnt from her mother Jhabbu Bai. She contributed to the construction of the Bhil hut in the Indira Gandhi Rashtriya Manav Sangrahalaya or Museum of Man in Bhopal, where she resides. In fact, when Bhuri Bai first arrived in Bhopal, she was engaged as a construction labourer at Bharat Bhavan—a job that earned her Rs 6 per day. It was here that she first met Jagdish Swaminathan, who spotted her talent and encouraged her to paint. Bhuri bai started her work alongside her community artist Lado Bai.

Style and themes 

Bhil art is considered by some to be the oldest of India's tribal art forms. It bears similarity to the aboriginal art of Australia, especially in its use of multi-coloured dots as in-filling. Bhuri Bai was the first artist of her community to start painting on paper. Her typically colourful canvases usually depict mythological themes, bucolic scenes and man-animal interactions, although later works have incorporated modern elements like airplanes and cellphones.

Exhibitions 
 2017 Satrangi : Bheel Art, Ojas Art, Delhi 
 2017 “Given Power: From Tradition to Contemporary”, Blueprint21 + Exhibit320, Delhi
 2010-2011 “Vernacular, in the Contemporary”, Devi Art Foundation, Bangalore
 2010 “Other Masters of India”, Musée du Quai Branly, Paris
 2009 “Now that the Trees Have Spoken”, Pundole Gallery, Mumbai
 2008 “Freedom”, Centre for International Modern Art (CIMA), Kolkata

Awards and honours 

 Shikhar Samman, Government of Madhya Pradesh, 1986 
 Ahalya Samman, 1998
 Rani Durgavati Award, 2009
Padma Shri Award, 2021

References

20th-century Indian painters
People from Jhabua district
Year of birth missing (living people)
Bhil people
Living people
20th-century Indian women
Indian women painters
Recipients of the Padma Shri in arts